Five Islands may refer to:

 Five Islands Nature Reserve, Australia
 Five Islands, Nova Scotia, Canada
 Five Islands in southern Louisiana
 Five Islands in Trinidad and Tobago
 Five Islands, Antigua and Barbuda
  Five Islands campus of the University of the West Indies
 Gotō Islands (五島列島, Gotō-rettō, literally: "five-island archipelago"), Japanese islands in the East China Sea

See also
 One Island (disambiguation)
 Two Islands
 Three Islands
 Seven Islands (disambiguation)
 Forty Islands
 Hundred Islands
 Thousand Islands (disambiguation)
 Ten Thousand Islands